Yahya "Rahim" Safavi (born 1952) is an Iranian military commander who served as the chief commander of the Islamic Revolutionary Guard Corps.

Early life
Safavi was born in 1952 in the city of Isfahan, Iran.

Career
Safavi was one of the leaders of the Iran–Iraq War. During the US-led invasion of Afghanistan, he played a key role in the uprising in Herat in November 2001, where American, Iranian and Northern Alliance troops supported a local uprising against the Taliban.

He served as the deputy commander of Islamic Revolutionary Guards Corps until 1997 when he was appointed its commander, replacing Mohsen Rezaee in 1997.

He was replaced as commander of the IRGC by Mohammad Ali Jafari, former director of the Strategic Studies Center of the IRGC on 1 September 2007. Then he was appointed by the Supreme Leader, Ali Khamenei as his special military advisor.

Asset freeze
On 24 December 2006, Rahim Safavi was listed in United Nations Security Council Resolution 1737 asking for his assets (among others') to be frozen because of alleged involvements in Iranian nuclear and ballistic missile programmes.

See also
 List of Iranian two-star generals since 1979

References

1952 births
Living people
Islamic Revolutionary Guard Corps personnel of the Iran–Iraq War
Islamic Revolutionary Guard Corps major generals
Recipients of the Order of Fath
University of Tabriz alumni
People from Isfahan Province